Irena Zemanová (Harman) (born 8 May 1977) is a former Czech competitive figure skater. Her highest placement at an ISU Championship was 9th at the 1994 World Junior Championships, and her highest placement at a senior ISU Championship was 13th at the 1994 European Championships. She placed 27th at the 1994 Winter Olympics. After retiring from competition, Zemanová became a coach and choreographer.

Results

References

External links 
 
 
 

1977 births
Czech female single skaters
Figure skaters at the 1994 Winter Olympics
Olympic figure skaters of the Czech Republic
Czech figure skating coaches
Figure skating choreographers
Living people
Sportspeople from Zlín
Female sports coaches